Chelsea Elizabeth Manning (born Bradley Edward Manning; December 17, 1987) is an American activist and whistleblower. She is a former  United States Army soldier who was convicted by court-martial in July 2013 of violations of the Espionage Act and other offenses, after disclosing to WikiLeaks nearly 750,000 classified, or unclassified but sensitive, military and diplomatic documents. She was imprisoned from 2010 until 2017 when her sentence was commuted by President Barack Obama. A trans woman, Manning stated in 2013 that she had a female gender identity since childhood and wanted to be known as Chelsea Manning.

Assigned in 2009 to an Army unit in Iraq as an intelligence analyst, Manning had access to classified databases. In early 2010, she leaked classified information to WikiLeaks and confided this to Adrian Lamo, an online acquaintance. Lamo indirectly informed the Army's Criminal Investigation Command, and Manning was arrested in May that same year. The material included videos of the July 12, 2007, Baghdad airstrike and the 2009 Granai airstrike in Afghanistan; 251,287 U.S. diplomatic cables; and 482,832 Army reports that came to be known as the "Iraq War Logs" and "Afghan War Diary". The material was published by WikiLeaks and its media partners between April 2010 and April 2011.

Manning was charged with 22 offenses, including aiding the enemy, which was the most serious charge and could have resulted in a death sentence. She was held at the Marine Corps Brig, Quantico in Virginia, from July 2010 to April 2011, under Prevention of Injury status—which entailed de facto solitary confinement and other restrictions that caused domestic and international concern—before being transferred to the Joint Regional Correctional Facility at Fort Leavenworth, Kansas, where she could interact with other detainees. She pleaded guilty in February 2013 to 10 of the charges. The trial on the remaining charges began on June 3, 2013, and on July 30, she was convicted of 17 of the original charges and amended versions of four others, but was acquitted of aiding the enemy. She was sentenced to 35 years at the maximum-security U.S. Disciplinary Barracks at Fort Leavenworth. On January 17, 2017, President Barack Obama commuted Manning's sentence to nearly seven years of confinement dating from her arrest in May 2010. After release, Manning earned a living through speaking engagements.

In 2018, Manning challenged incumbent Senator Ben Cardin for the Democratic nomination for the United States Senate election in her home state of Maryland. Manning received 6.1% of the votes; Cardin won renomination with 79.2% of the votes cast. From March 8, 2019, to March 12, 2020 (except for a week from May 9 to 16), Manning was jailed for contempt and fined $256,000 for refusing to testify before a grand jury investigating WikiLeaks founder Julian Assange.

Background

Early life
Born in 1987 in Oklahoma City, Oklahoma, Manning is the second child of Susan Fox, who is Welsh, and Brian Manning, an American. Brian had joined the United States Navy in 1974, at the age of 19, and served for five years as an intelligence analyst. Brian met Susan while stationed in Wales at RAF Brawdy. Manning's older sister, Casey Manning, was born in 1976. The couple returned to the United States in 1979, settling first in California.

Manning's sister Casey told the court-martial that both their parents were alcoholics, and that their mother drank continually while pregnant with Chelsea. Captain David Moulton, a Navy psychiatrist, told the court that Manning's facial features showed signs of fetal alcohol syndrome. Casey became Manning's principal caregiver, waking at night to prepare the baby's bottle. The court heard that Manning was fed only milk and baby food until the age of two.

Manning's father took a job as an information technology (IT) manager for a rental car agency, The Hertz Corporation, which required travel. The family lived several miles out of town, and Manning's mother was unable to drive. She spent her days drinking, while Manning was left largely to fend for herself, playing with Lego or on the computer. Brian would stock up on food before his trips, and leave pre-signed checks that Casey mailed to pay the bills. A neighbor said that whenever Manning's elementary school went on field trips, she would give her own son extra food or money so he could make sure Manning had something to eat. Friends and neighbors considered the Mannings a troubled family.

Parents' divorce, move to Wales
As a child, Manning was opinionated about the intersection of religion and politics. For example, she invariably remained silent during the part of the Pledge of Allegiance that makes reference to God.

In a 2011 interview, Manning's father said,  "People need to understand that he's a young man that had a happy life growing up." He also said that Manning excelled at the saxophone, science, and computers, and created a website at the age of 10. Manning learned how to use PowerPoint, won the grand prize three years in a row at the local science fair, and in sixth grade, took top prize at a statewide quiz bowl.

A childhood friend of Manning's, speaking about a conversation they had when Manning was 13, said: "he told me he was gay". The friend also said that Manning's home life was not good and that her father was very controlling. Around this time, Manning's parents divorced. She and her mother Susan moved out of the house to a rented apartment in Crescent, Oklahoma. Susan's instability continued, and in 1998 she attempted suicide; Manning's sister drove their mother to the hospital, with the 11-year-old Manning sitting in the back of the car trying to make sure their mother was still breathing.

Manning's father remarried in 2000, the same year as his divorce. His new wife, also named Susan, had a son from a previous relationship. When the son changed his surname to Manning too, Chelsea felt rejected, telling her mother, "I'm nobody now, Mom."

In November 2001, aged 14, Manning and her mother left the United States and moved to Haverfordwest, Wales, where her mother had family. Manning attended the town's Tasker Milward secondary school. A school friend there told Ed Caesar for The Sunday Times that Manning's personality was "unique, extremely unique. Very quirky, very opinionated, very political, very clever, very articulate." Manning's interest in computers continued, and in 2003, she and a friend, James Kirkpatrick, set up an online message board, angeldyne.com, that offered games and music downloads.

The only American, and viewed as effeminate, Manning became the target of bullying at school. Manning had come out to a few friends as gay back in Oklahoma, but was not open about it at school in Wales. The students frequently mocked her accent. One time, they abandoned her during a camping trip—of which incident, her aunt told The Washington Post that Manning had awoken to an empty campsite after the other campers had left without her.

Return to the United States
After graduating from high school in 2005 at age 17 and fearing her mother was becoming too ill to cope, she returned to the United States. She moved in with her father, then living in Oklahoma City with his second wife and her child. Manning landed employment as a developer for the software company Zoto. While there, she was apparently happy; however, she was let go after four months. Her boss told The Washington Post that on a few occasions Manning had "just locked up" and would simply sit and stare, and in the end, communication became too difficult. The boss told the newspaper that "nobody's been taking care of this kid for a really long time".

By then, Manning was living as an openly gay man. Her relationship with her father was apparently good, but there were problems between Manning and her stepmother. In March 2006, Manning reportedly threatened her stepmother with a knife during an argument about Manning's failure to get another job; the stepmother called the police, and Manning was asked to leave the house. Manning drove to Tulsa in a pickup truck her father had given her, at first slept in it, then moved in with a friend from school. The two gained jobs at Incredible Pizza in April. Manning moved on to Chicago before running out of money and again having nowhere to stay. Her mother arranged for Brian's sister, Debra, a lawyer in Potomac, Maryland, to take Manning in. American journalist and Manning biographer Denver Nicks wrote that the 15 months Manning spent with her aunt were among the most stable of her life. Manning had a boyfriend, took several low-paid jobs, and spent a semester studying history and English at Montgomery College but left after failing an exam.

Military service

Enlisting

Manning's father spent weeks in late 2007 asking her to consider joining the Army. Hoping to gain a college education through the G.I. Bill, and perhaps to study for a PhD in physics, she enlisted in September that year. She told her Army supervisor later that she had also hoped joining such a masculine environment would resolve her gender dysphoria.

Manning began basic training at Fort Leonard Wood, Missouri, on October 2, 2007. She wrote that she soon realized she was neither physically nor mentally prepared for it. Six weeks after enlisting, she was sent to the discharge unit. She was allegedly being bullied, and in the opinion of another soldier, was having a breakdown. The soldier told The Guardian: "The kid was barely five foot ... He was a runt, so pick on him. He's crazy, pick on him. He's a faggot, pick on him. The guy took it from every side. He couldn't please anyone." Nicks writes that Manning, who was used to being bullied, fought back—if the drill sergeants screamed at her, she would scream at them—to the point where they started calling her "General Manning".

The decision to discharge her was revoked, and she started basic training again in January 2008. After graduating in April, she moved to Fort Huachuca, Arizona, in order to attend Advanced Individual Training (AIT) for Military Occupational Specialty (MOS) 35F, intelligence analyst, receiving a TS/SCI security clearance (Top Secret/Sensitive Compartmented Information). According to Nicks, this security clearance, combined with the digitization of classified information and the government's policy of sharing it widely, gave Manning access to an unprecedented amount of material. Nicks writes that Manning was reprimanded while at Fort Huachuca for posting three video messages to friends on YouTube, in which she described the inside of the Sensitive Compartmented Information Facility (SCIF) where she worked. Upon completion of her initial MOS course, Manning received the Army Service Ribbon and the National Defense Service Medal.

Move to Fort Drum, deployment to Iraq

In August 2008, Manning was sent to Fort Drum in Jefferson County, New York, where she joined the 2nd Brigade Combat Team, 10th Mountain Division, and trained for deployment to Iraq. In late 2008 while stationed there, she met Tyler Watkins, who was studying neuroscience and psychology at Brandeis University, near Boston. Watkins was her first serious relationship, and she posted happily on Facebook about it, regularly traveling  to Boston on visits.

Watkins introduced her to a network of friends and the university's hacker community. She also visited Boston University's "hackerspace" workshop, known as "Builds", and met its founder, David House, the MIT researcher who was later allowed to visit her in jail. In November 2008, she gave an anonymous interview to a high-school reporter during a rally in Syracuse in support of gay marriage:

I was kicked out of my home and I once lost my job. The world is not moving fast enough for us at home, work, or the battlefield. I've been living a double life. ... I can't make a statement. I can't be caught in an act. I hope the public support changes. I do hope to do that before ETS [Expiration of Term of Service].For the anonymous interview, see Her, Phim. "Teen hears peoples' stories at LGBTQ rally", syracuse.com, November 17, 2008.For Manning's reference to the interview on Facebook, see "Bradley Manning's Facebook Page", PBS Frontline, March 2011.

Nicks writes that Manning would travel back to Washington, D.C., for visits. An ex-boyfriend helped her find her way around the city's gay community, introducing her to lobbyists, activists, and White House aides. Back at Fort Drum, she continued to display emotional problems and, by August 2009, had been referred to an Army mental-health counselor. A friend told Nicks that Manning could be emotionally fraught, describing an evening they had watched two movies together—The Last King of Scotland and Dancer in the Dark—after which Manning cried for hours. By September 2009, her relationship with Watkins was in trouble; they reconciled for a short time, but it was effectively over.

After four weeks at the Joint Readiness Training Center (JRTC) in Fort Polk, Louisiana, Manning was deployed to Forward Operating Base Hammer, near Baghdad, arriving in October 2009. From her workstation there, she had access to SIPRNet (the Secret Internet Protocol Router Network) and JWICS (the Joint Worldwide Intelligence Communications System). Two of her superiors had discussed not taking her to Iraq; it was felt she was a risk to herself and possibly others, according to a statement later issued by the Army—but the shortage of intelligence analysts dictated their decision to take her. In November 2009, she was promoted from Private First Class to Specialist.

Contact with gender counselor
In November 2009, Manning wrote to a gender counselor in the United States, said she felt female and discussed having surgery. The counselor told Steve Fishman of New York magazine in 2011 that it was clear Manning was in crisis, partly because of her gender concerns, but also because she was opposed to the kind of war in which she found herself involved.

She was by all accounts unhappy and isolated. Because of the military's "Don't ask, don't tell" (DADT) policy (in effect until September 20, 2011), Manning was unable to live as an openly gay man without risk of being discharged. But she apparently made no secret of her orientation: her friends said she kept a fairy wand on her desk. When she told her roommate she was attracted to men, he responded by suggesting they not speak to each other. Manning's working conditions included 14- to 15-hour night shifts in a tightly packed, dimly lit room.

On December 20, 2009, during a counseling session with two colleagues to discuss her poor time-keeping, Manning was told she would lose her one day off a week for persistent lateness. She responded by overturning a table, damaging a computer that was sitting on it. A sergeant moved Manning away from the weapons rack, and other soldiers pinned her arms behind her back and dragged her out of the room. Several witnesses to the incident believed her access to sensitive material ought to have been withdrawn at that point. The following month, January 2010, she began posting on Facebook that she felt hopeless and alone.

Release of material to WikiLeaks
Manning said her first contact with WikiLeaks took place in January 2010, when she began to interact with them on IRC and Jabber. She had first noticed them toward the end of November 2009, when they posted 570,000 pager messages from the September 11 attacks.

On January 5, 2010, Manning downloaded the 400,000 documents that became known as the Iraq War logs. On January 8, she downloaded 91,000 documents from the Afghanistan database, known later as part of the Afghan War logs. She saved the material on CD-RW and smuggled it through security by labeling the CD-RW media "Lady Gaga" and storing it in a Gaga CD case. She was lipsyncing to Lady Gaga music, to make it appear that she was using the classified computer's CD player to listen to music. She then copied it onto her personal computer. The next day, she wrote a message in a readme.txt file, which she told the court was initially intended for The Washington Post.

Manning copied the files from her laptop to an SD card for her camera so that she could take it with her to the United States while on R&R leave. Army investigators later found the SD card in Manning's basement room in her aunt's home, in Potomac, Maryland. On January 23, Manning flew to the United States via Germany, for two weeks of leave. It was during this visit that she first went out dressed as a woman, wearing a wig and makeup. After her arrest, Manning's friend Tyler Watkins told Wired that Manning had said during the visit that she had found some sensitive information and was considering leaking it. In 2021, Manning said that while home on leave in 2010, she had reached out to her then-Congressman, Chris Van Hollen, but got no response.

Manning contacted The Washington Post and The New York Times to ask whether they were interested in the material; the Post reporter did not sound interested, and the Times did not return the call. Manning decided instead to pass it to WikiLeaks, and on February 3 sent them the Iraq and Afghan War logs via Tor. She returned to Iraq on February 11, with no acknowledgment from WikiLeaks that they had received the files.

On or around February 18, she passed WikiLeaks a diplomatic cable, dated January 13, 2010, from the U.S. Embassy in Reykjavík, Iceland. They published it within hours, which suggested to Manning that they had received the other material, too. She found the Baghdad helicopter attack ("Collateral murder") video in a Judge Advocate's directory and passed it to WikiLeaks on or around February 21. In late March, she sent them a video of the May 2009 Granai airstrike in Afghanistan; this was the video later removed and apparently destroyed by Daniel Domscheit-Berg when he left the organization. Between March 28 and April 9, she downloaded the 250,000 diplomatic cables and on April 10, uploaded them to a WikiLeaks dropbox.

Manning told the court that, during her interaction with WikiLeaks on IRC and Jabber, she developed a friendship with someone there, believed to be Julian Assange (although neither knew the other's name), which she said made her feel she could be herself. Army investigators found 14 to 15 pages of encrypted chats, in unallocated space on her MacBook's hard drive, between Manning and someone believed to be Assange. She wrote in a statement that the more she had tried to fit in at work, the more alienated she became from everyone around her. The relationship with WikiLeaks had given her a brief respite from the isolation and anxiety.

Email to supervisor, recommended discharge
On April 24, 2010, Manning sent an email to her supervisor, Master Sergeant Paul Adkins—with the subject line "My Problem"—saying she was suffering from gender identity disorder. She attached a photograph of herself dressed as a woman and with the filename breanna.jpg. She wrote:

This is my problem. I've had signs of it for a very long time. It's caused problems within my family. I thought a career in the military would get rid of it. It's not something I seek out for attention, and I've been trying very, very hard to get rid of it by placing myself in situations where it would be impossible. But, it's not going away; it's haunting me more and more as I get older. Now, the consequences of it are dire, at a time when it's causing me great pain in itself ...

Adkins discussed the situation with Manning's therapists, but did not pass the email to anybody above him in his chain of command; he told Manning's court-martial that he was concerned the photograph would be disseminated among other staff. Captain Steven Lim, Manning's company commander, said he first saw the email after Manning's arrest, when information about hormone replacement therapy was found in Manning's room on base; at that point Lim learned that Manning had been calling herself Breanna. 

Manning told former "grey hat" hacker Adrian Lamo that she had set up Twitter and YouTube accounts as Breanna to give her female identity a digital presence, writing to Lamo: "I wouldn't mind going to prison for the rest of my life [for leaking information], or being executed so much, if it wasn't for the possibility of having pictures of me ... plastered all over the world press ... as [a] boy ... the CPU is not made for this motherboard". On April 30 she posted on Facebook that she was utterly lost, and over the next few days wrote that she was "not a piece of equipment", and was "beyond frustrated" and "livid" after being "lectured by ex-boyfriend despite months of relationship ambiguity".

On May 7, according to Army witnesses, Manning was found curled in a fetal position in a storage cupboard; she had a knife at her feet and had cut the words "I want" into a vinyl chair. A few hours later she had an altercation with a female intelligence analyst, Specialist Jihrleah Showman, during which she punched Showman in the face. The brigade psychiatrist recommended a discharge, referring to an "occupational problem and adjustment disorder". Manning's supervisor removed the bolt from her weapon, making it unable to fire, and she was sent to work in the supply office, although at this point her security clearance remained in place. As punishment for the altercation with Showman, she was demoted from Specialist (E-4) to Private First Class (E-3) three days before her arrest on May 27.

Ellen Nakashima writes that, on May 9, Manning contacted Jonathan Odell, a gay American novelist in Minneapolis, via Facebook, leaving a message that she wanted to speak to him in confidence; she said she had been involved in some "very high-profile events, albeit as a nameless individual thus far". On May 19, according to Army investigators, she emailed Eric Schmiedl, a mathematician she had met in Boston, and told him she had been the source of the Baghdad airstrike video. Two days later, she began the series of chats with Adrian Lamo that led to her arrest.

Publication of leaked material

WikiLeaks

WikiLeaks was set up in late 2006 as a disclosure portal, initially using the Wikipedia model, where volunteers would write up restricted or legally threatened material submitted by whistleblowers. It was Julian Assange—an Australian Internet activist and journalist, and the de facto editor-in-chief of WikiLeaks—who had the idea of creating what Ben Laurie called an "open-source, democratic intelligence agency". The open-editing aspect was soon abandoned, but the site remained open for anonymous submissions.

According to Daniel Domscheit-Berg, a former WikiLeaks spokesperson, part of the WikiLeaks security concept was that they did not know who their sources were. The New York Times wrote in December 2010 that the U.S. government was trying to discover whether Assange had been a passive recipient of material from Manning, or had encouraged or helped her to extract the files; if the latter, Assange could be charged with conspiracy. Manning told Lamo in May 2010 that she had developed a working relationship with Assange, communicating directly with him using an encrypted Internet conferencing service, but knew little about him. WikiLeaks did not identify Manning as their source. Army investigators found pages of chats on Manning's computer between Manning and someone believed to be Julian Assange. Nicks writes that, despite this, no decisive evidence was found of Assange's offering Manning any direction.

Reykjavik13

On February 18, 2010, WikiLeaks posted the first of the material from Manning, the diplomatic cable from the U.S. Embassy in Reykjavík, a document now known as "Reykjavik13". On March 15, WikiLeaks posted a 32-page report written in 2008 by the U.S. Department of Defense about WikiLeaks itself, and on March 29 it posted U.S. State Department profiles of politicians in Iceland.

Baghdad airstrike

WikiLeaks named the Baghdad airstrike video "Collateral Murder", and Assange released it on April 5, 2010, during a press conference at the National Press Club in Washington, D.C. The video showed two US helicopters firing on a group of 10 men in the Amin District of Baghdad. Among the people killed in the attack were two Reuters employees, who were there to photograph an American Humvee under attack by the Mahdi Army. The US pilots mistook their cameras for weapons. The helicopters also fired on a van, targeted earlier by one helicopter, that had stopped to help wounded members of the first group. Two children in the van were wounded, and their father was killed. The pilots also attacked a building where retreating insurgents were holed up. The Washington Post wrote that the video, viewed by millions, put WikiLeaks on the map. According to Nicks, Manning emailed a superior officer after the video aired and tried to persuade her that it was the same version as the one stored on SIPRNet. Nicks writes that it seemed as though Manning wanted to be caught.

Afghan War logs, Iraq War logs

On July 25, 2010, WikiLeaks and three media partners—The New York Times, The Guardian, and Der Spiegel—began publishing the 91,731 documents that, in their entirety, became known as the Afghan War Logs. (Around 77,000 of these had been published as of May 2012.) This was followed on October 22, 2010, by 391,832 classified military reports covering the period January 2004 to December 2009, which became known as the Iraq War Logs. Nicks writes that the publication of the former was a watershed moment, the "beginning of the information age exploding upon itself".

Diplomatic cables

Manning was also responsible for the "Cablegate" leak of 251,287 State Department cables, written by 271 American embassies and consulates in 180 countries, dated December 1966 to February 2010. The cables were passed by Assange to his three media partners, plus El País and others, and published in stages from November 28, 2010, with the names of sources removed. WikiLeaks said it was the largest set of confidential documents ever to be released into the public domain. WikiLeaks published the remaining cables, unredacted, on September 1, 2011, after David Leigh and Luke Harding of The Guardian inadvertently published the passphrase for a file that was still online; Nicks writes that, consequently, one Ethiopian journalist had to leave his country, and the U.S. government said it had to relocate several sources.

Guantanamo Bay files
Manning was also accused of being the source of the Guantanamo Bay files leak, obtained by WikiLeaks in 2010 and published by The New York Times and The Guardian in April 2011.

Granai airstrike

Manning said she gave WikiLeaks a video, in late March 2010, of the Granai airstrike in Afghanistan. The airstrike occurred on May 4, 2009, in the village of Granai, Afghanistan, killing 86 to 147 Afghan civilians. The video was never published; Julian Assange said in March 2013 that Daniel Domscheit-Berg had taken it with him when he left WikiLeaks and had apparently destroyed it.

Manning and Adrian Lamo

First contact

On May 20, 2010, Manning contacted Adrian Lamo, a former "grey hat" hacker convicted in 2004 of having accessed The New York Times computer network two years earlier without permission. Lamo had been profiled that day by Kevin Poulsen in Wired magazine; the story said Lamo had been involuntarily hospitalized and diagnosed with Asperger syndrome. Poulsen, by then a reporter, was himself a former hacker who had used Lamo as a source several times since 2000. Indeed it was Poulsen who, in 2002, had told The New York Times that Lamo had gained unauthorized access to its network; Poulsen then wrote the story up for SecurityFocus. Lamo would hack into a system, tell the organization, then offer to fix their security, often using Poulsen as a go-between.

Lamo said Manning sent him several encrypted emails on May 20. He said he was unable to decrypt them but replied anyway and invited the emailer to chat on AOL IM. Lamo said he later turned the emails over to the FBI without having read them.

Chats
In a series of chats between May 21 and 25, Manning—using the handle "bradass87"—told Lamo that she had leaked classified material. She introduced herself as an Army intelligence analyst, and within 17 minutes, without waiting for a reply, alluded to the leaks.

Lamo replied several hours later. He said: "I'm a journalist and a minister. You can pick either, and treat this as a confession or an interview (never to be published) & enjoy a modicum of legal protection." They talked about restricted material in general, then Manning made her first explicit reference to the leaks: "This is what I do for friends." She linked to a section of the May 21, 2010, version of Wikipedia's article on WikiLeaks, which described the WikiLeaks release in March that year of a Department of Defense report on WikiLeaks itself. She added "the one below that is mine too"; the section below in the same article referred to the leak of the Baghdad airstrike ("Collateral Murder") video. Manning said she felt isolated and fragile, and was reaching out to someone she hoped might understand.

Manning said she had started to help WikiLeaks around Thanksgiving in November 2009—which fell on November 26 that year—after WikiLeaks had released the 9/11 pager messages; the messages were released on November 25. She told Lamo she had recognized that the messages came from an NSA database and that seeing them had made her feel comfortable about stepping forward. Lamo asked what kind of material Manning was dealing with; Manning replied: "uhm ... crazy, almost criminal political backdealings ... the non-PR-versions of world events and crises ..." Although she said she dealt with Assange directly, Manning also said Assange had adopted a deliberate policy of knowing very little about her, telling Manning: "lie to me."

Lamo again assured her that she was speaking in confidence. Manning wrote: "but im not a source for you ... im talking to you as someone who needs moral and emotional fucking support," and Lamo replied: "i told you, none of this is for print."

Manning said the incident that had affected her the most was when 15 detainees had been arrested by the Iraqi Federal Police for printing anti-Iraqi literature. She was asked by the Army to find out who the "bad guys" were, and discovered that the detainees had followed what Manning said was a corruption trail within the Iraqi cabinet. She reported this to her commanding officer, but said "he didn't want to hear any of it"; she said the officer told her to help the Iraqi police find more detainees. Manning said it made her realize, "i was actively involved in something that i was completely against ..."

She explained that "i cant separate myself from others ... i feel connected to everybody ... like they were distant family," and cited Carl Sagan, Richard Feynman and Elie Wiesel. She said she hoped the material would lead to "hopefully worldwide discussion, debates, and reforms. if not ... than [sic] we're doomed as a species." She said she had downloaded the material onto Lady Gaga music CD-RWs, erased the music and replaced it with a compressed split file. Part of the reason no one noticed, she said, was that staff were working 14 hours a day, seven days a week, and "people stopped caring after 3 weeks."

Lamo approaches authorities, chat logs published
Shortly after the first chat with Manning, Lamo discussed the information with Chet Uber of the volunteer group Project Vigilant, which researches cybercrime, and with Timothy Webster, a friend who had worked in Army counterintelligence. Both advised Lamo to go to the authorities. His friend informed the Army's Criminal Investigation Command (CID), and Lamo was contacted by CID agents shortly thereafter. He told them he believed Manning was endangering lives. He was largely ostracized by the hacker community afterwards. Nicks argues, on the other hand, that it was thanks to Lamo that the government had months to ameliorate any harm caused by the release of the diplomatic cables.

Lamo met with FBI and Army investigators on May 25 in California, and showed them the chat logs. On or around that date he also passed the story to Kevin Poulsen of Wired, and on May 27 gave him the chat logs and Manning's name under embargo. He met with the FBI again that day, at which point they told him Manning had been arrested in Iraq the day before. Poulsen and Kim Zetter broke the news of the arrest in Wired on June 6. Wired published around 25 percent of the chat logs on June 6 and 10, and the full logs in July 2011.

Legal proceedings

Arrest and charges

Manning was arrested by the Army's Criminal Investigation Command, on May 27, 2010, and transferred four days later to Camp Arifjan in Kuwait. She was charged with several offenses in July, replaced by 22 charges in March 2011, including violations of Articles 92 and 134 of the Uniform Code of Military Justice (UCMJ), and of the Espionage Act. The most serious charge was "aiding the enemy", a capital offense, although prosecutors said they would not seek the death penalty. Another charge, which Manning's defense called a "made up offense" but of which she was found guilty, read that Manning "wantonly [caused] to be published on the internet intelligence belonging to the US government, having knowledge that intelligence published on the internet is accessible to the enemy".

Detention

While in Kuwait, Manning was placed on suicide watch after her behavior caused concern. She was moved from Kuwait to the Marine Corps Base Quantico, Virginia, on July 29, 2010, and classified as a maximum custody detainee with Prevention of Injury (POI) status. POI status is a less extreme form of suicide watch, entailing checks by guards every five minutes. Her lawyer, David Coombs, a former military attorney, said Manning was not allowed to sleep between 5 am (7 am on weekends) and 8 pm, and was made to stand or sit up if she tried to. She was required to remain visible at all times, including at night, which entailed no access to sheets, no pillow except one built into her mattress, and a blanket designed not to be shredded. Manning complained that she regarded it as pretrial punishment.

Her cell was 6 × 12 ft (1.8 x 3.6 m) with no window, containing a bed, toilet, and sink. The jail had 30 cells built in a U shape, and although detainees could talk to one another, they were unable to see each other. Her lawyer said the guards behaved professionally and had not tried to harass or embarrass Manning. She was allowed to walk for up to one hour a day, meals were taken in the cell, and she was shackled during visits. There was access to television when it was placed in the corridor, and she was allowed to keep one magazine and one book. Because she was in pretrial detention, she received full pay.

On January 18, 2011, after Manning had an altercation with the guards, the commander of Quantico classified her as a suicide risk. Manning said the guards had begun issuing conflicting commands, such as "turn left, don't turn left," and upbraiding her for responding to commands with "yes" instead of "aye". Shortly afterward, she was placed on suicide watch, had her clothing and eyeglasses removed, and was required to remain in her cell 24 hours a day. The suicide watch was lifted on January 21 after a complaint from her lawyer, and the brig commander who ordered it was replaced.
On March 2, she was told that her request for removal of POI status—which entailed among other things sleeping wearing only boxer shorts—had been denied. Her lawyer said Manning joked to the guards that, if she wanted to harm herself, she could do so with her underwear or her flip-flops. The comment resulted in Manning's being ordered to strip naked in her cell that night and sleep without clothing. On the following morning only, Manning stood naked for inspection. Following her lawyer's protest and media attention, Manning was issued a sleeping garment on or before March 11.

The detention conditions prompted national and international concern. Juan E. Méndez, United Nations Special Rapporteur on torture, told The Guardian that the U.S. government's treatment of Manning was "cruel, inhuman and degrading". In January 2011, Amnesty International asked the British government to intervene because of Manning's status as a British citizen by descent, although Manning's lawyer said Manning did not regard herself as a British citizen. On March 10, State Department spokesman Philip J. Crowley criticized Manning's treatment as "ridiculous, counterproductive and stupid". The following day, President Obama responded to Crowley's comments, saying the Pentagon had assured him that Manning's treatment was "appropriate and meet[s] our basic standards". Under political pressure, Crowley resigned three days after his comments. On March 15, 295 members of the academic legal community signed a statement arguing that Manning was being subjected to "degrading and inhumane pretrial punishment" and criticizing Obama's comments. On April 20, the Pentagon transferred Manning to the medium-custody Midwest Joint Regional Correctional Facility, at Fort Leavenworth, Kansas, where she was placed in an 80-square-foot cell with a window and a normal mattress, able to mix with other pretrial detainees and keep personal objects in her cell.

Evidence presented at Article 32 hearing
In April 2011, a panel of experts, having completed a medical and mental evaluation of Manning, ruled that she was fit to stand trial. An Article 32 hearing, presided over by Lieutenant Colonel Paul Almanza, was convened on December 16, 2011, at Fort Meade, Maryland; the hearing resulted in Almanza's recommending that Manning be referred to a general court-martial. She was arraigned on February 23, 2012, and declined to enter a plea.

During the Article 32 hearing, the prosecution, led by Captain Ashden Fein, presented 300,000 pages of documents in evidence, including chat logs and classified material. The court heard from two Army investigators, Special Agent David Shaver, head of the digital forensics and research branch of the Army's Computer Crime Investigative Unit (CCIU); and Mark Johnson, a digital forensics contractor from ManTech International, who works for the CCIU. They testified that they had found 100,000 State Department cables on a workplace computer Manning had used between November 2009 and May 2010; 400,000 military reports from Iraq and 91,000 from Afghanistan on an SD card found in her basement room in her aunt's home in Potomac, Maryland; and 10,000 cables on her personal MacBook Pro and storage devices that they said had not been passed to WikiLeaks because a file was corrupted. They also recovered 14 to 15 pages of encrypted chats, in unallocated space on Manning's MacBook hard drive, between Manning and someone believed to be Julian Assange. Two of the chat handles, which used the Berlin Chaos Computer Club's domain (ccc.de), were associated with the names Julian Assange and Nathaniel Frank.

Johnson said he found SSH logs on the MacBook that showed an SFTP connection, from an IP address that resolved to Manning's aunt's home, to a Swedish IP address with links to WikiLeaks. Also found was a text file named "Readme", attached to the logs and apparently written by Manning to Assange, which called the Iraq and Afghan War logs "possibly one of the most significant documents of our time, removing the fog of war and revealing the true nature of 21st century asymmetric warfare". The investigators testified they had also recovered an exchange from May 2010 between Manning and Eric Schmiedl, a Boston mathematician, in which Manning said she was the source of the Baghdad helicopter attack ("Collateral Murder") video. Johnson said there had been two attempts to delete the material from the MacBook. The operating system had been re-installed in January 2010, and on or around January 31, 2010, an attempt had been made to erase the hard drive by doing a "zero-fill", which involves overwriting material with zeroes. The material was recovered after the overwrite attempts from unallocated space.

Manning's lawyers argued that the government had overstated the harm the release of the documents had caused and had overcharged Manning to force her to give evidence against Assange. The defense also raised questions about whether Manning's confusion over her gender identity affected her behavior and decision making.

Guilty plea, trial, sentence

The judge, Army Colonel Denise Lind, ruled in January 2013 that any sentence would be reduced by 112 days because of the treatment Manning received at Quantico. On February 28, Manning pleaded guilty to 10 of the 22 charges. Reading for over an hour from a 35-page statement, she said she had leaked the cables "to show the true cost of war". Prosecutors pursued a court-martial on the remaining charges.

The trial began on June 3, 2013. Manning was convicted on July 30, on 17 of the 22 charges in their entirety, including five counts of espionage and theft, and an amended version of four other charges; she was acquitted of aiding the enemy. The sentencing phase began the next day.

Captain Michael Worsley, a military psychologist who had treated Manning before her arrest, testified that Manning had been left isolated in the Army, trying to deal with gender identity issues in a "hyper-masculine environment". David Moulton, a Navy forensic psychiatrist who saw Manning after the arrest, said Manning had narcissistic traits, and showed signs of both fetal alcohol syndrome and Asperger syndrome. He said that, in leaking the material, Manning had been "acting out [a] grandiose ideation".

A defense psychiatrist, testifying to Manning's motives, suggested a different agenda:Well, Pfc Manning was under the impression that his leaked information was going to really change how the world views the wars in Afghanistan and Iraq, and future wars, actually. This was an attempt to crowdsource analysis of the war, and it was his opinion that if ... through crowdsourcing, enough analysis was done on these documents, which he felt to be very important, that it would lead to a greater good ... that society as a whole would come to the conclusion that the war wasn't worth it ... that really no wars are worth it.

On August 14, Manning apologized to the court: "I am sorry that my actions hurt people. I'm sorry that they hurt the United States. I am sorry for the unintended consequences of my actions. When I made these decisions I believed I was going to help people, not hurt people. ... At the time of my decisions, I was dealing with a lot of issues."

Manning's offenses carried a maximum sentence of 90 years. The government asked for 60 years as a deterrent to others, while Manning's lawyer asked for no more than 25 years. She was sentenced on August 21 to 35 years in prison, reduction in rank to private (private E-1 or PVT), forfeiture of all pay and allowances, and a dishonorable discharge. She was given credit for 1,293 days of pretrial confinement, including 112 days for her treatment at Quantico, and would have been eligible for parole after serving one-third of the sentence. She was confined at the United States Disciplinary Barracks (USDB) at Fort Leavenworth, Kansas.

The sentence was criticized as "unjust and unfair" by The Guardian, and as "excessive" by The New York Times.

On April 14, 2014, Manning's request for clemency was denied; the case went to the United States Army Court of Criminal Appeals for further review.

Requests for release
On September 3, 2013, Manning's lawyer filed a Petition for Commutation of Sentence to President Obama through the pardon attorney at the Department of Justice and Secretary of the Army John M. McHugh. The petition contended that Manning's disclosures did not cause any "real damage", and that the documents in question did not merit protection as they were not sensitive. The request included a supporting letter from Amnesty International which said that Manning's leaks had exposed violations of human rights. David Coombs's cover letter touched on Manning's role as a whistleblower, asking that Manning be granted a full pardon or that her sentence be reduced to time served.

In April 2015, Amnesty International posted online a letter from Manning in which she wrote: "I am now preparing for my court-martial appeal before the first appeals court. The appeal team, with my attorneys Nancy Hollander and Vince Ward, are hoping to file our brief before the court in the next six months. We have already had success in getting the court to respect my gender identity by using feminine pronouns in the court filings (she, her, etc.)."

In November 2016, Manning made a formal petition to President Obama to reduce her 35-year sentence to the six years of time she had already served. On December 10, 2016, a White House petition to commute her sentence reached the minimum 100,000 signatures required for an official response. Lawyers familiar with clemency applications stated in December 2016 that the pardon was unlikely to happen; the request did not fit into the usual criteria.

Commutation
In January 2017, a Justice Department source said that Manning was on President Obama's short list for a possible commutation. On January 17, 2017, President Obama commuted all but four months of Manning's remaining sentence. In a press conference held on January 18, Obama stated that Manning's original 35-year prison sentence was "very disproportionate relative to what other leakers have received" and that "it makes sense to commute—and not pardon—her sentence." In 2021, Forbes reported that Obama's commutation of Manning's sentence was "unconditional." Notwithstanding her commutation, Manning's military appeal would continue, with her attorney saying, "We fight in her appeal to clear her name."

On January 26, 2017, in her first column for The Guardian since the commutation, Manning lamented that President Obama's political opponents consistently refused to compromise, resulting in "very few permanent accomplishments" during his time in office. As The Guardian summarized it, she saw Obama's legacy as "a warning against not being bold enough". In response, President Donald Trump tweeted that Manning was an "ungrateful traitor" and should "never have been released".

Release

Manning was released from Fort Leavenworth's detention center at approximately 2 a.m. Central Time on May 17, 2017. Although sentenced during her court-martial to be dishonorably discharged, Manning was reportedly returned to active unpaid "excess leave" status while her appeal was pending.

Appeal
On May 31, 2018, the U.S. Army Court of Criminal Appeals upheld Manning's 2013 court-martial conviction of violating the Espionage Act. The court rejected Manning's contention that the statute was too vague to provide fair notice of the criminal nature of disclosing classified documents. "The facts of this case," the three-judge panel ruled, "leave no question as to what constituted national defense information. Appellant's training and experience indicate, without any doubt, she was on notice and understood the nature of the information she was disclosing and how its disclosure could negatively affect national defense." The court also rejected Manning's assertion that her actions in disclosing classified information related to national security are protected by the First Amendment. Manning, the court found, "had no First Amendment right to make the disclosures—doing so not only violated the nondisclosure agreements she signed but also jeopardized national security."

On May 30, 2019, the U.S. Court of Appeals for the Armed Forces denied Manning's petition for grant of review of the decision of the U.S. Army Court of Criminal Appeals.

2019 jailing for contempt
In February 2019, Manning received a subpoena to testify in a U.S. government case against WikiLeaks founder Julian Assange, the existence of which had been accidentally revealed in November 2018, which was proceeding under prosecutors in Virginia. Manning objected to the secrecy of the grand jury proceedings and announced she would refuse to testify, saying "we've seen this power abused countless times to target political speech. I have nothing to contribute to this case and I resent being forced to endanger myself by participating in this predatory practice." Manning also said she had provided all the information she had in 2013 during her court martial and that she stood by her previous answers.

On March 8, 2019, Manning was found in contempt of court and jailed in the women's wing of a detention center in Alexandria, Virginia, with the judge conditioning her release on her testifying or the grand jury concluding its work. Manning was initially held in administrative segregation for 28 days until she was placed in the general population on April 5, 2019. Her supporters described her period in administrative segregation as "effective solitary confinement" as it involved "up to 22 hours each day spent in isolation". Officials at the facility said that administrative segregation was used for safety reasons and that prisoners still had access to recreation and social visits during that time. On April 22, 2019, a federal appeals court upheld the trial court's decision holding Manning in contempt and denied a request by Manning that she be released on bail.

After the grand jury's term expired, Manning was released on May 9, 2019, and served with another subpoena to appear before a new grand jury on May 16. Manning again refused to testify, stating that she "believe[d] this grand jury seeks to undermine the integrity of public discourse with the aim of punishing those who expose any serious, ongoing, and systemic abuses of power by this government". The court ordered her returned to jail and fined $500 for each day over 30 days and $1,000 for each day over 60 days. In June 2019, she challenged the fines because of inability to pay. On December 30, 2019, United Nations special rapporteur Nils Melzer released a letter dated November 1, 2019 in which he accused the U.S. government of torturing Manning, called for her immediate release, and called for her court fines to be canceled or reimbursed.

On March 11, 2020, Manning attempted suicide two days before she was scheduled to appear before a judge on a motion to terminate sanctions. Alexandria Sheriff Dana Lawhorne reported that Manning was safe and her lawyers said she was recovering in a hospital.

On March 12, 2020, U.S. District Judge Anthony Trenga of the Eastern District of Virginia found that the business of the grand jury had concluded. Since Manning's testimony was no longer needed, the judge found that detention no longer served any coercive purpose, and ordered her released. He denied a request by Manning's lawyers to vacate her accrued fines of $256,000, which he ordered due and payable immediately. That same day, a supporter launched an online crowdfunding campaign to defray Manning's fines. Within 48 hours, nearly 7,000 donations ranging from $5 to $10,000 were received, totaling $267,000. A separate crowdfund by the same supporter raised an additional $50,000 to help pay Manning's post-incarceration living expenses.

In January 2021, in refusing to extradite WikiLeaks founder Julian Assange to the U.S. for trial on federal charges, UK District Judge Vanessa Baraitser cited Manning's March 2020 suicide attempt to support finding that, if exposed to the "harsh conditions" of incarceration in America, "Assange's mental health would deteriorate causing him to commit suicide."

Reaction to disclosures

The publication of the leaked material, particularly the diplomatic cables, attracted in-depth coverage worldwide, with several governments blocking websites that contained embarrassing details. Alan Rusbridger, editor of The Guardian, said: "I can't think of a time when there was ever a story generated by a news organization where the White House, the Kremlin, Chávez, India, China, everyone in the world was talking about these things. ... I've never known a story that created such mayhem that wasn't an event like a war or a terrorist attack."

United States Navy Admiral Michael Mullen, then Chairman of the Joint Chiefs of Staff, said the leaks had placed the lives of American soldiers and Afghan informants in danger. Journalist Glenn Greenwald argued that Manning was the most important whistleblower since Daniel Ellsberg leaked the Pentagon Papers in 1971. In an impromptu questioning session after a fundraiser, captured on a cell phone video, President Barack Obama said that Manning "broke the law", which was later criticized as "unlawful command influence" on Manning's upcoming trial.

In 2011, Manning and WikiLeaks were credited in part, along with news reporters and political analysts, as catalysts for the Arab Spring that began in December 2010, when waves of protesters rose up against rulers across the Middle East and North Africa, after the leaked cables exposed government corruption. In 2012, however, James L. Gelvin, an American scholar of Middle Eastern history, wrote: "After the outbreak [January 2011] of the Egyptian uprising ... journalists decided to abandon another term they had applied to the Tunisian uprising: the first 'WikiLeaks Revolution,' a title they had adopted that overemphasized the role played by the leaked American cables about corruption in provoking the protests."

A Washington Post editorial asked why an apparently unstable Army private had been able to access and transfer sensitive material in the first place. According to her biographer, the American far right saw Manning's sexuality as evidence that gay people were unfit for military service, while the American mainstream thought of Manning as a gay soldier driven mad by bullying.

A report written by the Department of Defense a year after the breach found that Manning's document leaks had no significant strategic impact on U.S. war efforts. The heavily redacted final report was not published until June 2017, after a Freedom of Information request by investigative reporter Jason Leopold.

Awards and tributes
In 2011, Manning was awarded a "Whistleblowerpreis" by the German Section of the International Association of Lawyers against Nuclear Arms and the Federation of German Scientists. While still in detention in 2011, Graham Nash of Crosby, Stills and Nash released a song, "Almost Gone (The Ballad of Bradley Manning)", in reference to her deteriorated mental state. In 2012, she was awarded "People's Choice Award" awarded by Global Exchange. In 2013, she was awarded the US Peace Prize by the US Peace Memorial Foundation "for conspicuous bravery, at the risk of his own freedom, above and beyond the call of duty." In the same year, she was awarded the Sean MacBride Peace Prize by the International Peace Bureau. In 2014, she was awarded the Sam Adams Award by Sam Adams Associates for Integrity in Intelligence.

Icelandic and Swedish Pirate Party MPs nominated Manning and fellow whistleblower Edward Snowden for the 2014 Nobel Peace Prize. In 2013, Roots Action launched a petition nominating Manning for the prize that received more than 100,000 supporting signatures.

In May 2015, Anything to Say?, an art installation made of mobile bronze statues of Manning, Edward Snowden, and Julian Assange, was placed at Berlin's Alexanderplatz for a weekend, as a "monument for courage". Germany's Green Party sponsored the sculpture created by Italian sculptor Davide Dormino. Afterwards, the installation was moved and exhibited in different European cities.

In 2015, Paper magazine commissioned artist Heather Dewey-Hagborg to create 2D DNA phenotype portraits of Manning using DNA collected from cheek swabs and hair clippings sent to the artist from the incarcerated soldier. 3D printed versions of the portraits premiered at the World Economic Forum in 2016. In the summer of 2017, Manning (by then released from prison) and Dewey-Hagborg presented their collaboration as part of an exhibition at the Fridman Gallery in New York City.

In September 2017, Manning accepted the EFF Pioneer Award in recognition of her actions as a whistleblower and for her work as an advocate for government transparency and transgender rights. In November, she was named 2017 Newsmaker of the Year by Out, which noted her "whistle-in-the-wind tenacity that belies the trauma she's had to contend with". Later that month, Bitch listed her among the first-ever "Bitch 50" impactful creators, artists, and activists in pop culture, recognizing her as "a leading voice for transgender and healthcare rights". In December, Foreign Policy honored Manning as one of its forty-eight 2017 Global Thinkers "for forcing the United States to question who is a traitor and who is a hero".

In October 2020, Manning shared with the German nonprofit investigative journalism organization CORRECT!V and Greece's anonymous Novartis whistleblowers the third annual European United Left–Nordic Green Left (GUE/NGL) prize for Journalists, Whistleblowers and Defenders of the Right to Information. The GUE/NGL posted a video of her acceptance from her home in Brooklyn, New York.

Gender transition

2010–2013
In an article written by Manning, she says her first public appearance as female was in February 2010 while on leave from her military duties; Manning was exhilarated to blend in as a woman.

On August 22, 2013, the day after sentencing, Manning's attorney issued a press release to the Today show announcing that his client was a female, and asked that she be referred to by her new name of Chelsea and feminine pronouns. Manning's statement included the following:

The news media split in its reaction to Manning's request; some organizations used the new name and pronouns, and others continued to use the former ones. Advocacy groups such as GLAAD, the National Lesbian and Gay Journalists Association, and the Human Rights Campaign (HRC) encouraged media outlets to refer to Manning by her self-identified name and pronoun.

2014

In April 2014, the Kansas District Court granted a petition from Manning for a legal name change. An Army spokesman stated that while the Army would update personnel records to acknowledge the name change, the military would continue to regard Manning as a male. Manning sought hormone therapy and the right to live as a woman while confined, consistent with her gender dysphoria, which had been confirmed by two Army medical specialists. Such treatment is provided in civilian federal prisons when it is found to be medically necessary, but it is not available in military prisons. The Pentagon policy at the time considered transgender individuals ineligible to serve.

In July, the Federal Bureau of Prisons rejected a request by the Army to transfer Manning from the USDB to a civilian facility for treatment of her gender dysphoria. Instead, the Army kept Manning in military custody and said it would begin rudimentary gender treatment, which could include allowing her to wear female undergarments and possibly receive hormone treatments.

On August 12, 2014, the American Civil Liberties Union (ACLU) and Manning's civilian attorney David Coombs said Manning was not receiving treatment for her gender identity condition as previously approved by Secretary of Defense Chuck Hagel. They notified the USDB, Hagel and other Defense Department officials that a lawsuit would be filed if they did not confirm by September 4 that treatment would be provided. On August 22, Army spokeswoman Lt. Col. Alayne Conway told NBC News, "The Department of Defense has approved a request by Army leadership to provide required medical treatment for an inmate diagnosed with gender dysphoria." Although Conway would not discuss "the medical needs of an individual", she did say, "In general terms, the initial stages of treatment for individuals with gender dysphoria include psychotherapy and elements of the 'real life experience' therapy. Treatment for the condition is highly individualized and generally is sequential and graduated." The Army declined to say when treatment might begin.

In September, Manning filed a lawsuit in federal district court in Washington, D.C., against Secretary of Defense Hagel, claiming she had "been denied access to medically necessary treatment" for gender dysphoria. She sued to be allowed to grow her hair longer and use cosmetics, and to receive hormone treatments "to express her female gender".

2015
On February 12, 2015, USA Today reported that the commandant of the USDB wrote in a February 5 memo, "After carefully considering the recommendation that (hormone treatment) is medically appropriate and necessary, and weighing all associated safety and security risks presented, I approve adding (hormone treatment) to Inmate Manning's treatment plan." According to USA Today, Manning remained a soldier, and the decision to administer hormone therapy was a first for the Army. Manning was not allowed to grow her hair longer. Her ACLU attorney, Chase Strangio, said that the delay in approving her hormone treatment "came with a significant cost to Chelsea and her mental health".

On March 5, in response to Manning's request for an order compelling the military to use pronouns that conform to her chosen gender identity, the U.S. Army Court of Criminal Appeals ruled, "Reference to appellant in all future formal papers filed before this court and all future orders and decisions issued by this court shall either be neutral, e.g., Private First Class Manning or appellant, or employ a feminine pronoun."

On March 14, the digital library host Cryptome posted an unsigned public copy of a court document, filed March 10, wherein the parties to Manning's September 2014 lawsuit against Secretary of Defense Hagel agreed to stay proceedings for seven months, after which time they would address how the litigation should proceed in light of Manning's status at that time. The document revealed that the Army was then providing Manning with weekly psychotherapy, including psychotherapy specific to gender dysphoria; cross-sex hormone therapy; female undergarments; the ability to wear prescribed cosmetics in her daily life at the USDB; and speech therapy.

In April 2015, Amnesty International posted online a letter from Manning in which she said:
I finally began my prescribed regime of hormones to continue my overdue gender transition in February. It's been such an amazing relief for my body and brain to finally come into alignment with each other. My stress and anxiety levels have tapered off quite considerably. Overall, things are beginning to move along nicely.

2016–2018
On September 13, 2016, the ACLU announced that the army would be granting Manning's request for gender transition surgery, a first for a transgender inmate. In December, Manning's attorneys reported that her military doctor refused Manning's request to change the gender on her military records to female.

In January 2017, Manning wrote to The New York Times that although months had passed, she had still not seen a surgeon. At the time of Manning's release from prison in May 2017, her attorney stressed that she would be pursuing her own medical care and "building her life on her own terms, separate from the military". Manning subsequently stated via her verified Twitter account that her healthcare from the military had stopped on May 16, 2017, and that she had secured a private health plan. She said her gender transition while in prison had cost "only $600 over 2 years", explaining that the Department of Defense "got meds at a markdown". Although the Army had agreed in September 2016 to allow her to have gender transition surgery, the operation was not performed before her release.

On May 22, 2017, Manning's 2014 lawsuit seeking a federal court to order the Defense Department to provide hormone therapy and other treatment for her gender identity condition was dismissed because, her ACLU attorney explained, "she is free".

On October 20, 2018, Manning tweeted a photograph of herself in a hospital bed reportedly recovering from gender reassignment surgery. "After almost a decade of fighting," she wrote, "thru prison, the courts, a hunger strike, and thru the insurance company—I finally got surgery this week." In March 2019, in the context of medical care provided during her re-incarceration, the news media continued to report that she had undergone gender reassignment surgery. In a declaration to the United States District Court for the Eastern District of Virginia filed on May 6, 2019, Manning formally attested that she underwent gender confirmation surgery in October 2018.

Prison life
In March 2015, Bloomberg News reported that Manning could be visited by only those she had named before her imprisonment, and not by journalists. She could not be photographed or give interviews on camera. Manning was not allowed to browse the web, but could consult print news and have access to new gender theory texts.

In April 2015, Amnesty International posted online a letter from Manning in which she described her daily life. "My days here are busy and very routine," she wrote. "I am taking college correspondence courses for a bachelor's degree. I also work out a lot to stay fit, and read newspapers, magazines and books to keep up-to-date on current events around the world and learn new things."

Also that month, Cosmopolitan published the first interview with Manning in prison, conducted by mail. Cosmo reported that Manning was optimistic about recent progress but said that not being allowed to grow her hair long was "painful and awkward ... I am torn up. I get through each day okay, but at night, when I'm alone in my room, I finally burn out and crash." Manning said it was "very much a relief" to announce that she is a woman and did not fear the public response. "Honestly, I'm not terribly worried about what people out there might think of me. I just try to be myself." According to Cosmo, Manning had her own cell with "two tall vertical windows that face the sun", and could see "trees and hills and blue sky and all the things beyond the buildings and razor wire". Manning denied being harassed by other inmates and claimed some had become confidantes.

Writing
In February 2015, Katharine Viner, editor-in-chief of Guardian US, announced that Manning had joined The Guardian as a contributing opinion writer on war, gender, and freedom of information. In 2014, The Guardian had published two op-eds by Manning: "How to make Isis fall on its own sword" (September 16) and, "I am a transgender woman and the government is denying my civil rights" (December 8). Manning's debut under the new arrangement, "The CIA's torturers and the leaders who approved their actions must face the law," appeared on March 9, 2015.

In April 2015, Manning began communicating via Twitter, under the handle @xychelsea, by using a voice phone to dictate to intermediaries, who tweeted on her behalf.

Suicide attempts
On July 5, 2016, Manning was taken to a hospital after a suicide attempt. On July 28, 2016, the ACLU announced that Manning was under investigation and facing several possible charges related to her suicide attempt. She was not allowed to have legal representation at the disciplinary hearing for these charges. At the hearing, held on September 22, she was sentenced to 14 days in solitary confinement, with seven of those days suspended indefinitely. Manning emerged from solitary confinement on October 12, after serving seven days; she said that she was not given the opportunity to appeal the ruling before being placed in solitary.

In an article following her recovery, entitled "Moving On", Manning reflected on her change in identity, wishing people to see her no longer as "Chelsea Manning, formerly Bradley Manning, a US Army Soldier... convicted...", but as a person. She used a selfie from 2008 to accompany the article.

In November 2016, Manning disclosed that she made a second suicide attempt on October 4, 2016, on the first night of her solitary confinement.

Hunger strike
On September 9, 2016, Manning began a hunger strike to protest what she described as her being bullied by prison authorities and the U.S. government. On September 13, the ACLU announced that Manning had ended the five-day hunger strike after the Army agreed to provide gender transition surgery. The operation, however, was not performed before her release from prison in May 2017.

Post-prison life

In a June 9, 2017, appearance on Good Morning America, her first interview following her release, Manning said she "accepted responsibility" for her actions, and thanked former President Obama for giving her "another chance". She now earns a living through speaking engagements.

Harvard visiting fellowship and rescindment
On September 13, 2017, Manning was named a visiting fellow at Harvard University. Bill Delahunt, acting director of the Harvard Institute of Politics, said: "Broadening the range and depth of opportunity for students to hear from and engage with experts, leaders and policy-shapers is a cornerstone of the Institute of Politics. We welcome the breadth of thought-provoking viewpoints on race, gender, politics and the media." Harvard said Manning would visit for a limited number of events meant to spark campus discussion, and in particular would engage students in discourse on "issues of LGBTQ identity in the military". According to online newspaper PinkNews, this marked "the only LGBT-related fellowship in Harvard history".

The next day Michael Morell, former deputy director and twice acting director of the Central Intelligence Agency (CIA), resigned as a nonresident senior fellow at Harvard's Belfer Center for Science and International Affairs. "Unfortunately," Morell wrote, "I cannot be part of an organization—The Kennedy School—that honors a convicted felon and leaker of classified information ... the Kennedy School's decision will assist Ms. Manning in her long-standing effort to legitimize the criminal path that she took to prominence, an attempt that may encourage others to leak classified information as well." Later that day, CIA director Mike Pompeo advised the university that he supported Morell's decision, and withdrew from his scheduled public appearance that evening at Harvard's John F. Kennedy School of Government. Calling Manning an "American traitor", Pompeo wrote: "While I have served my country as a soldier in the United States Army and will continue to defend Ms. Manning's right to offer a defense of why she chose this path, I believe it is shameful for Harvard to place its stamp of approval upon her treasonous actions."

On September 15, 2017, Douglas Elmendorf, dean of the Kennedy School, announced that Manning had been invited to spend only a single day at the school and that her title of visiting fellow did not convey a special honor. "We did not intend to honor her in any way," Elmendorf wrote, "or to endorse any of her words or deeds ... However, I now think that designating Chelsea Manning as a Visiting Fellow was a mistake, for which I accept responsibility. ... Therefore, we are withdrawing the invitation to her to serve as a Visiting Fellow—and the perceived honor that it implies to some people—while maintaining the invitation for her to spend a day at the Kennedy School and speak in the Forum. I apologize to her and to the many concerned people from whom I have heard today for not recognizing upfront the full implications of our original invitation." When Elmendorf phoned Manning, a member of her support team challenged him to explain why Harvard was so concerned about the title "visiting fellow". The team was alienated by his response, which they inferred suggested she had nothing to contribute. Manning then hung up on the dean.

On September 17, 2017, during a public appearance at The Nantucket Project in Massachusetts, Manning said: "I'm not ashamed of being disinvited. I view that just as much of an honored distinction as the fellowship itself." She added, "This is a military intelligence and it is a police state in which we can no longer engage in actual political discourse in our institutions."

Denied entry to Canada
On September 22, 2017, Manning was denied entry to Canada from the United States because of her criminal record. According to a letter from Canadian immigration officials, posted online by Manning, she is inadmissible due to being convicted of offenses equivalent to treason in Canada. Manning told Reuters that she had planned to vacation in Montreal and Vancouver, but was stopped at a Quebec border crossing by the Canada Border Services Agency on the evening of September 21 and detained overnight. She said she would retain a Canadian lawyer to challenge the inadmissibility finding before a Canadian tribunal. In October 2021, appearing virtually at an Immigration and Refugee Board hearing to determine her admissibility, Manning called the four-year process to visit Canada "exhausting." When questioned by the adjudicator, Manning did not go into detail about what she leaked because she is bound by a non-disclosure agreement with the U.S. government. The two-day hearing concluded with the adjudicator indicating a final written decision could be expected in 2022.

On April 8, 2022, Canada's Immigration and Refugee Board upheld the government's decision to bar Manning's entry.

Restriction on speech
During an October 8, 2017, appearance at The New Yorker Festival, Manning said she is legally unable to speak about certain details concerning her leaks, confirming a July 2017 post from her verified Twitter account saying "technically,  read, comment on, discuss, or even look at any leaked material, even if it was after 2010".

U.S. Senate candidacy
On January 11, 2018, Manning filed with the Federal Election Commission to run for the U.S. Senate in Maryland. On January 18, Manning filed with the Maryland State Board of Elections to challenge the state's senior senator, two-term incumbent Ben Cardin, as a Democrat in the June 26, 2018, primary election.

On February 1, The Washington Post raised questions about Manning's eligibility to run. "While her case is on appeal," reported The Post, "she is on a technical form of unpaid active duty, putting her political campaign at odds with Department of Defense regulations that prohibit military personnel from seeking public office." Military law expert Eugene R. Fidell of Yale Law School considered it unlikely the Army would take action against her, saying, "Services don't like to create martyrs." On February 2, Manning commented: "This is an issue that's cropped up mostly from the conservative blogosphere, and the campaign and we don't believe this is an issue at all. ... I've been issued a dishonorable discharge, and I'm not sure where the issue lies in this case." She also confirmed that she was still appealing her court-martial sentence.

In mid-February, she said she had no plans to run television ads, explaining, "I can't stand watching campaign ads. We don't need to go to these old-media methods." Commenting on her opponent, 74-year-old incumbent Ben Cardin, she stated, "He's old hat. He's kept this establishment going."

In May, Manning told the Associated Press that she did not, in fact, consider herself a Democrat, but wanted to shake up establishment Democrats who were "caving in" to President Trump. The AP noted that, despite having raised $72,000 during the first quarter (compared to the incumbent's $336,000), "The candidate has barely made an effort at tapping sources of grassroots enthusiasm outside of activism circles. And it's easy to find progressive Democrats who feel her candidacy is just a vehicle to boost her profile." Manning said she would not run as an independent should her primary bid fail.

On June 26, 2018, Manning finished second among eight Democrats vying for their party's U.S. Senate nomination in Maryland's primary election. Manning received 5.8% of the votes. Incumbent Ben Cardin won renomination with 80.4% of the votes cast.

Shortly after the polls closed, Manning posted a statement on her campaign website. "Over the past several months," she wrote, "it has become clear that my experiences have taken an enormous toll on my physical and emotional health. I stepped back from campaigning to prioritize my own well-being." She thanked "the more than one thousand individual donors who generously contributed to our campaign," and "our team of hundreds of volunteers." But, she added, "after spending hours and hours knocking on doors and making phone calls, I'm convinced that the change people truly need goes beyond what our corrupt two-party system is willing to offer."

Interactions with far-right social media figures

On January 20, 2018, Manning attended "A Night for Freedom" hosted by far-right social media personality Mike Cernovich at the nightclub FREQ in Hell's Kitchen, Manhattan. The party was billed, in Cernovich's words, as a "gathering of patriots and political dissidents who are bored with mainstream political events", and included right-wing figures such as Gavin McInnes, James O'Keefe, Lucian Wintrich, and Jack Posobiec. According to The Washington Post, Manning's attendance infuriated the far-left. "What followed," The Post reported, "was an overheated Internet tug-of-war between opposite sides of the political spectrum, each accusing the other of co-opting Manning, while her intentions were relentlessly picked apart." Manning afterward stated that she was acting as a double agent, infiltrating the alt-right to gather information and insight about alt-right rally plans.

It later emerged this was not the first time she had interacted with those identified as being on the alt-right. In December 2017, after first getting in touch with Cassandra Fairbanks (an admirer and writer for the right-wing website The Gateway Pundit), Manning participated with Fairbanks, Posobiec, Wintrich, and others in Escape the Room DC, and spent an evening drinking and playing Cards Against Humanity at Wintrich's apartment with him, Fairbanks, and others. Speaking to The Daily Beast after the revelations about her attendance at "A Night for Freedom" Manning claimed that she had only attended in an attempt to gain information on their movement stating, "I viewed this as an opportunity to use the celebrity and fame I've gotten since getting out of prison to gather information and to ultimately find ways in which we who are against the alt-right can undermine the alt-right." She added, "The thing in all this that I've learned is that they don't actually believe the things that they say. I just feel they're opportunists and that they exploit their Twitter followers' fears." Manning acknowledged, however, that these incidents left many of her own supporters feeling betrayed. "People have every right to be confused and hurt by this," she said. "Regardless of good intentions, I leveraged my privilege to gain access to spaces others couldn't dream of entering safely. I never meant to hurt my supporters. No amount of information on the alt-right is worth losing the trust of my supporters."

Tour of Australia and New Zealand
In August 2018, the Government of Australia refused to issue Manning a visa to enter the country, where she was scheduled to make a series of public appearances. The company arranging Manning's speaking tour said it would appeal the decision, taken under s501(1) of the Migration Act, which authorizes a minister to refuse a visa on character grounds. The Department of Home Affairs specified that Manning did not pass the character test because of her "substantial criminal record". On September 2, Manning spoke as scheduled at the Sydney Opera House except that she appeared onscreen live via satellite from Los Angeles.

On August 31, 2018, Immigration New Zealand granted Manning special direction to apply for a work visa to enter New Zealand, stating there was "no reason to believe Ms Manning would not comply with the terms and conditions of any visa issued". Due to her previous convictions for espionage and other offenses, Manning is subject to character provisions of the Immigration Act. Manning had plans to tour Auckland and Wellington on September 8 and 9. Prime Minister Jacinda Ardern defended the New Zealand Government's decision to allow Manning entry, stating that "we are a nation that allows free speech". By contrast, the center-right National Party had called for Manning to be banned from entering New Zealand on national security grounds due to her espionage and computer fraud convictions.

Career as network security consultant
In August 2021, Forbes reported that Manning had been contracted to conduct an information security audit with NYM Technologies SA, a Switzerland-based for-profit cryptocurrency startup "to send data anonymously around the Internet using the same blockchain technology underlying Bitcoin."

Memoir

In May 2019, Manning announced that Farrar, Straus & Giroux would publish her memoir. She said it would be primarily a personal narrative that would not relitigate the facts of her case. The book, titled README.txt, was published in 2022.

DJing
Prior to her arrest in 2010, Manning was known to DJ on occasion. Manning returned to DJing in August 2022.

See also

 Information security
 Information sensitivity
 LGBT people in prison
 List of people pardoned or granted clemency by the president of the United States
 McCarran Internal Security Act of 1950
 Reception of WikiLeaks
 The Source (oratorio)
 Yours Truly (2019 film)

Notes

Citations

Bibliography

Books

Key articles

 Caesar, Ed. "Bradley Manning: Wikileaker" , The Sunday Times, December 19, 2010;  from the original on April 7, 2012.
 Fishman, Steve. "Bradley Manning's Army of One", New York Magazine, July 3, 2011.
 Greenwald, Glenn. "The strange and consequential case of Bradley Manning, Adrian Lamo and WikiLeaks", Salon, June 18, 2010.
 Last, Jonathan V. "The Left's Canonization of St. Bradley Manning" , CBS News, January 11, 2011.
 Manning, Bradley. "Memorandum", released by David Coombs, March 10, 2011; archived from the original on April 6, 2012.
 Manning, Bradley. "PFC Manning's statement redacted", January 29, 2013.
 Nakashima, Ellen. "Bradley Manning is at the center of the WikiLeaks controversy. But who is he?", The Washington Post, May 4, 2011;  from the original on April 7, 2012.
 Nicks, Denver. "Private Manning and the Making of Wikileaks", This Land, September 23, 2010.
 PBS Frontline. "Bradley Manning's Facebook Page", March 2011; archived from the original on April 7, 2011.
 Smith, Martin. "The Private Life of Bradley Manning", PBS Frontline, March 7, 2011 (interview transcripts: "Brian Manning" and "Jordan Davis").
 Thompson, Ginger. "Early Struggles of Soldier Charged in Leak Case", The New York Times, August 8, 2010.
 Zetter, Kim. "Jolt in WikiLeaks Case: Feds Found Manning-Assange Chat Logs on Laptop", Wired, December 19, 2011.

Key articles on the Lamo–Manning chat log, in order of publication

 Poulsen, Kevin. "Ex-Hacker Adrian Lamo Institutionalized for Asperger's", Wired magazine, May 20, 2010.
 Poulsen, Kevin and Zetter, Kim. "U.S. Intelligence Analyst Arrested in WikiLeaks Video Probe", Wired magazine, June 6, 2010.
 Poulsen, Kevin and Zetter, Kim. 'I Can't Believe What I'm Confessing to You': The WikiLeaks Chats", Wired magazine, June 10, 2010.
 Nakashima, Ellen. "Messages from alleged leaker Bradley Manning portray him as despondent soldier", The Washington Post, June 10, 2010.
 Greenwald, Glenn. Email exchange between Glenn Greenwald and Kevin Poulsen, June 14–17, 2010.
 Poulsen, Kevin and Zetter, Kim. "Three Weeks After Arrest, Still No Charges in WikiLeaks Probe", Wired magazine, June 16, 2010.
 Jardin, Xeni. "WikiLeaks: a somewhat less redacted version of the Lamo/Manning logs", Boing Boing, June 19, 2010.
 Greenwald, Glenn. "The worsening journalistic disgrace at Wired" , Salon, December 27, 2010.
 Hansen, Evan and Poulsen, Kevin. "Putting the Record Straight on the Lamo-Manning Chat Logs", Wired magazine, December 28, 2010.
 Greenwald, Glenn. "Wired's refusal to release or comment on the Manning chat logs" , Salon, December 29, 2010.
 Firedoglake. "Manning/WikiLeaks timeline", published as a complete version of the released excerpts. Retrieved March 14, 2011;  from the original on March 28, 2012.
 Hansen, Evan. "Manning-Lamo Chat Logs Revealed", Wired magazine, July 13, 2011;  from the original on March 28, 2012.

Further reading

Articles
 Khatchadourian, Raffi. "No Secrets", The New Yorker, June 7, 2010.
 The Guardian. "Afghanistan: The War Logs". Retrieved May 9, 2012.
 The Guardian. "Iraq: The War Logs". Retrieved May 9, 2012.
 The New York Times. "The War Logs" – WikiLeaks Documents. Retrieved May 9, 2012.
 Wired. "Bradley Manning". Retrieved August 26, 2017.

Books
 Assange, Julian. Julian Assange: The Unauthorised Autobiography. Canongate, 2011. .
 Madar, Chase. The Passion of Bradley Manning. OR Books, 2012. .
 Mitchell, Greg and Gosztola, Kevin. Truth and Consequences: The U.S. vs. Bradley Manning. Sinclair Books, 2012. .
 Maxwell, Lida. Insurgent Truth: Chelsea Manning and the Politics of Outsider Truth-Telling. Oxford University Press, 2019. .
 Fischer, Mia. Terrorizing Gender: Transgender Visibility and the Surveillance Practices of the U.S. Security State. University of Nebraska Press, 2019. .
 Lombardi, Chris. I Ain't Marching Anymore: Dissenters, Deserters, and Objectors to America's Wars. The New Press, 2020. .

External links

 
 
 
 Federal Election Commission (FEC) Form 2 Statement of Candidacy filed January 11, 2018 by Chelsea Elizabeth Manning
 Federal Election Commission (FEC) Maryland – Senate Candidate Financial Totals including Chelsea Elizabeth Manning
 Chelsea Manning for U.S. Senate campaign website

1987 births
Living people
21st-century American criminals
21st-century American politicians
Activists from Oklahoma
American atheists
American female criminals
American LGBT military personnel
American people of Welsh descent
American whistleblowers
Articles containing video clips
Criminals from Oklahoma
Freedom of information activists
Iraq War legal issues
LGBT people from Oklahoma
Maryland Democrats
People educated at Tasker-Milward V.C. School
People from Logan County, Oklahoma
People convicted under the Espionage Act of 1917
Political prisoners
Political prisoners in the United States
Prisoners and detainees of the United States military
Recipients of American presidential clemency
Transgender military personnel
Transgender women
Transgender writers
United States Army personnel of the Iraq War
United States Army personnel who were court-martialed
United States Army soldiers